Alicia Cook may refer to:

 Alicia Keys (Alicia Augello Cook, born 1981), American singer, songwriter, pianist and actress
 Alicia Cook (poet), poet, essayist and activist